The 2023 Akwa Ibom State gubernatorial election will take place on 18 March 2023, to elect the Governor of Akwa Ibom State, concurrent with elections to the Akwa Ibom State House of Assembly as well as twenty-seven other gubernatorial elections and elections to all other state houses of assembly. The election—which was postponed from its original 11 March date—will be held three weeks after the presidential election and National Assembly elections. Incumbent PDP Governor Udom Gabriel Emmanuel is term-limited and cannot seek re-election to a third term.

Party primaries were scheduled for between 4 April and 9 June 2022 with the Peoples Democratic Party nominating former commissioner Umo Eno on 25 May while the All Progressives Congress nominated businessman Akanimo Udofia on 26 May in a controversial process that was initially not recognized by INEC; Udofia was only recognized after a Supreme Court ruling on 7 March 2023. As the APC was unable to overturn the INEC decision until days to the election, the nominees of smaller parties became major contenders like former Senator John James Akpan Udo-Edehe (New Nigeria Peoples Party) and Senator Bassey Albert Akpan (Young Progressives Party).

Electoral system
The Governor of Akwa Ibom State is elected using a modified two-round system. To be elected in the first round, a candidate must receive the plurality of the vote and over 25% of the vote in at least two-thirds of state local government areas. If no candidate passes this threshold, a second round will be held between the top candidate and the next candidate to have received a plurality of votes in the highest number of local government areas.

Background
Akwa Ibom State is a small state in the South South mainly populated by Efik-Ibibio peoples; although its oil reserves make it one of the most wealthy states in the nation, Akwa Ibom has faced challenges in security, environmental degradation, and lack of affordable housing in large part due to years of systemic corruption.

Politically, the state's 2019 elections were categorized as a reassertion of the PDP's dominance after Senator Godswill Akpabio and his allies that switched to the APC lost. Statewise, Emmanuel easily won re-election with nearly 75% of the vote and 25 of 26 House of Assembly seats were won by the PDP. The PDP was also successful federally, unseating all APC senators and house members to sweep all three senate and ten House of Representatives seats as 
the state was easily won by PDP presidential nominee Atiku Abubakar with about 68% but still swung towards the APC and had lower turnout.

During Emmanuel's second term, his administration stated focuses included the completion of the Ibom Deep Seaport, Ibom Air, further industrialisation, and upgrading transportation infrastructure; however, he was routinely criticized for authoritarian-esque responses to critics and journalists. Alarms were raised most notably after the arrest of a critical banker, the threatened demolition of a critic's church, and the barring of journalists from state government events. At other points during his administration, Emmanuel was criticized for a poor response to the COVID-19 pandemic by dismissing the state’s chief epidemiologist after he refused to suppress testing, his administration’s systemic budget misappropriation and perceived corruption, his unconstitutional declaration of Akwa Ibom as a Christian state and state construction of a Christian worship centre, and the Seaport’s proposed location. On the other hand, he was praised for expanding Ibom Air, sports development, and a relatively low crime rate.

Primary elections
The primaries, along with any potential challenges to primary results, were to take place between 4 April and 3 June 2022 but the deadline was extended to 9 June. An informal zoning gentlemen's agreement sets the Akwa Ibom North-East Senatorial District to have the next governor as Akwa Ibom North-East has not held the governorship since 2007. While no major party has yet closed their primaries to non-Northeast candidates, nearly all potential candidates are from the North-East and it appears as if major parties are holding to the zoning agreement.

All Progressives Congress 
The year prior to the APC primaries was beset by party infighting between three factions each supported by former Governor and Minister Godswill Akpabio, former Senator and potential gubernatorial candidate John James Akpan Udo-Edehe, or former Senator and fellow potential gubernatorial candidate Ita Enang which culminated in three parallel party congresses in October 2021. As Udo-Edehe was a member of national APC leadership at the time, his faction was recognized by the national party in February 2022 but was later removed by a court decision in favour of Akpabio's faction. The court ruling came after Udo-Edehe left his role as Caretaker National Secretary, thus he was unable to stop newly elected National Chairman, Abdullahi Adamu, from swearing in Akpabio's faction; however, Akpan Udo-Edehe's faction received a court order telling parties to maintain the status quo and reporting later showed that Akpabio's faction had forged documents to convince the court to rule in its favour. In wake of the reports, the party factionalized as Akpabio's faction and Udo-Edehe's faction opened separate headquarters and each claimed to be the legitimate party structure as the national party recognized Akpabio's faction while Udo-Edehe's faction was recognized by INEC.

On the date of the primary, the party crisis escalated as both factions attempted to hold their own primaries with nation party observers at the Akpabio faction primary on Ekpo Obot Street in Uyo while the state Commissioner of Police and State Resident Electoral Commissioner were at the Udo-Edehe faction primary in the Sheergrace Arena. Supporters of the two faction then spent the day fighting over control of official voting materials, delaying the exercise until early the next morning. Eventually, the Akpabio faction conducted its primary with businessman Akanimo Udofia easily winning but as other candidates rejected the process and analysts noted that the primary's legitimacy was questionable due to the lack of INEC observers. Losing out, Udo-Edehe protested the event before leaving the party to obtain the NNPP gubernatorial nomination while Enang asked a court to nullify the results.

By mid-June, it was revealed that the INEC Resident Electoral Commissioner Mike Igini's report listed that no legitimate primary took place for the state All Progressives Congress. In response, Akpabio allies attempted to discredit Igini but the REC was supported by the national commission, which confirmed the report. However, Udofia initiated litigation that culminated in a Supreme Court ruling in early March 2023 that ordered INEC to recognize Udofia as the legitimate nominee; the commission complied a few days later.

Nominated 
 Akanimo Udofia: businessman

Eliminated in primary 
 Richard Anana
 Ita Enang: former aide to President Muhammadu Buhari (2015–2022), former Senator for Akwa Ibom North-East (2011–2015), and former House of Representatives member for Itu/Ibiono Ibom (1999–2011)
 Larry Esin: 2007 PDP gubernatorial candidate
 Uduak Udo
 John James Akpan Udo-Edehe: APC Caretaker Committee National Secretary (2020–2022), former Minister of State for the Federal Capital Territory (2007–2008), and former Senator for Akwa Ibom North-East (1999–2003) (defected after the primary to successfully run in the NNPP gubernatorial primary)
 Austin Utuk: businessman

Results

People's Democratic Party 
In January 2022, former Governor Victor Attah announced that candidate Umo Eno was outgoing Governor Udom Gabriel Emmanuel's endorsed candidate much to the chagrin of opposing PDP members who raised fears over potential imposition. Emmanuel defended the endorsement, saying that it was in the best interest of the state and state party chairman Aniekan Akpan also backed Eno. Further criticism emerged when reports that Eno had forged court documents to illegally arrest striking workers resurfaced in February.

Ahead of primary day, further claims of manipulation were tabled against Eno supporters leading Emmanuel to swiftly announce that there would be a post-primary reconciliation process. However, the announcement did not halt outcry as some candidates withdrew in protest on primary day including Senator Bassey Albert Akpan and House member Onofiok Luke while House member Michael Enyong held his own parallel primary at the Ewet Housing Estate. When the primary was held at the Godswill Akpabio International Stadium, Eno won the nomination after announced results showed him winning over 97% of the delegates' votes. After the primary, the state PDP set up a reconciliation committee to unify the party; however, issues for Ono emerged by July when Akpan defected to become the YPP gubernatorial nominee while another former opponent—Akan Okon—approached the judiciary to disqualify Ono based on claims of educational certificate forgery. Although Eno initially labeled the court case as a political stunt, the West African Examinations Council confirmed that the certificates Eno submitted to INEC did not match documents in the organisation’s records. In response, Eno's representatives changed his court defense and Eno publicly vowed to leave both politics and preaching if the forgery allegations were proven accurate. While the controversy swirled, Eno proceeded with his campaign and named Senator Akon Eyakenyi as his running mate.

Although Okon's case was dismissed by rulings from a Federal High Court in November and Court of Appeal in January, he continues to the Supreme Court as of late January. However, Enyong returned to the forefront with his own lawsuit against Eno that argued that the Ewet Housing Estate primary was legitimate thus Enyong is the rightful nominee. On 20 January, a Federal High Court in Abuja ruled in favour of Enyong and ordered INEC to declare him as the legitimate nominee; while the PDP publicly rejected the ruling, reporting revealed underlying fear that INEC may actually switch recognition to Enyong. Eno and the PDP later filed an application to the Court of Appeal to have the previous ruling dismissed; however, the court rejected the application and adjourned on the case. Nevertheless, the head of Eno's legal team claimed that he was still the PDP nominee due to a stay request from their campaign. Eventually, a Court of Appeal ruling returned recognition to Eno in late February.

Nominated 
 Umo Eno: former Commissioner for Lands and Housing and former Chairman of the Akwa Ibom Hotels and Tourism Board (2004–2007)
 Running mate—Akon Eyakenyi: Senator for Akwa Ibom South (2019–present); former Minister of Lands, Housing and Urban Development (2010–2015); and former Commissioner for Industry, Commerce and Tourism

Eliminated in primary 
 Sampson Sydney Akpan: businessman
 Janet Moses Edem
 Michael Enyong: House of Representatives member for Uyo/Uruan/Nsit Atai/Ibesikpo Asutan
 Aniekan Etim: financial analyst
 James Iniama: 2007 ACN gubernatorial nominee
 Akan Okon: former Commissioner for Economic Development and the Ibom Deep Seaport
 David Okpon: pastor
 Ide Owodiong-Idemeko: 2019 PDP Akwa Ibom North-East senatorial candidate
 Idorenyin James Umo: businessman
 Ani Wellington: businessman

Withdrew 
 Bassey Albert Akpan: Senator for Akwa Ibom North-East (2015–present) and former Commissioner for Finance (2007–2014) (defected after the primary to successfully run in the YPP gubernatorial primary)
 Onofiok Luke: House of Representatives member for Etinan/Nsit Ibom/Nsit Ubium (2019–present), former House of Assembly member for Nsit Ubium (2011–2019), and former House of Assembly Speaker (2015–2019)
 Akanimo Udofia: businessman (defected prior to the primary to successfully run in the APC gubernatorial primary)

Declined 
 Effiong Dickson Bob: former Senator for Akwa Ibom North-East (2007–2014)
 Ini Ememobong: Commissioner for Information and Strategy (2020–present)
 Udom Inoyo: businessman

Results

Minor parties 

 Coffie Emem Samuel (Accord)
Running mate: Archibong Love Charles Efiom
 Ekanem Abasiekeme Mfonobong (Action Alliance)
Running mate: Asuquo Edet
 Essien Ekere Sunday (Action Democratic Party)
Running mate: Effiong Godwin Okon
 Mbaba Ehpraim Okon (Action Peoples Party)
Running mate: Essang Ebiange Nelly Edet
 Robert Otu Iboro (African Action Congress)
Running mate: Carolyna Hutchings
 Ezekiel Nya-Etok (African Democratic Congress)
Running mate: James Uduak Udoma
 Ekong Eyo Eyo (Allied Peoples Movement)
Running mate: Edwin Raphael Umoette
 Ekpo Ita Bassey (All Progressives Grand Alliance)
Running mate: Udoh Anietie Augustus
 Akaninyene Effiong Ekpenyong (Boot Party)
Running mate: Itoneeshiet Amaiso
 Uko Usen Okon (Labour Party)
Running mate: Victor Okon Okwong
 John James Akpan Udo-Edehe (New Nigeria Peoples Party)
Running mate: Godwin Micheal Afangideh
 Etang Kubiat Bassey (National Rescue Movement)
Running mate: Ekpe Mfon Effiong
 Ekanem Sunday Francis (People's Redemption Party)
Running mate: Emmanuel Effiom Ene
 Udoh Emem Monday (Social Democratic Party)
Running mate: Ukut Benedict Asuquo
 Bassey Albert Akpan (Young Progressives Party)
Running mate: Asuquo Amba
 Thomas Nsikak Hogan (Zenith Labour Party)
Running mate: Udoyo Essi Umo

Campaign
As the general election campaign commenced, focus was on the PDP's attempts to unify the party after the contentious primary process and INEC's non-recognition of the APC primary. While APC figures spent June and July 2022 trying to get INEC to recognise its primary and attacking REC Mike Igini as biased, the PDP attempted to prevent defections from aggrieved party members with a reconciliation committee headed by Senator Effiong Dickson Bob. However, the reconciliation attempt failed as Senator Bassey Albert Akpan left for the Young Progressives Party; similarly, former Senator John James Akpan Udo-Edehe left the APC for the New Nigeria Peoples Party. More disappointing news for the APC came at the end of July when INEC's list of provisional nominees did not recognize Akanimo Udofia as the nominee. For the PDP, good news came at the beginning of August when MHR Onofiok Luke declined to defect and restart his gubernatorial campaign, instead endorsing Ono in a deal brokered by Ntenyin Solomon Etuk—the Oku Ibom Ibibio and Paramount Ruler of Nsit-Ubium. However, a few days later, Akpan formally obtained the YPP nomination at a rerun primary.

Observers noted that regional balance, not just party unity, would also be required for successful campaigns as the PDP faced internal issues due to the decision not to micro-zone the nomination; internal opponents pointed out that Ono is from a federal constituency that has already produced a governor. Other factors included corruption allegations against Akpan and Eno, the relatively small size of the NNPP and YPP compared to the PDP, and a purported plot by some in the APC to coax Udo-Edehe back to the party to become its nominee along with lawsuits against both Akpan and Eno. The zoning controversy, along with the court case attempting to disqualify Ono based on certificate forgery, negatively impacted PDP campaigning in August and September. However, the case was dismissed in November.

By mid-November, pundits observed a swell in minor party support (mainly for the YPP) in the absence of clear opposition to the PDP; however, analysts also noted that minor party supporters were often backing Peter Obi (LP) on the presidential level which could hurt Akpan as Obi supporters would need to split their ticket to vote for both Obi and Akpan. At the same time, both Eno and Akpan intensified their campaigns with Eno commencing his campaign with a rally in the Godswill Akpabio International Stadium while Akpan presented his governance plan to monarchs and other figures. However, a major shift occurred on 1 December when Akpan's long-running corruption trial concluded in a guilty verdict and 42-year imprisonment sentence; as Akpan was promptly incarcerated, the future of his candidacy was unclear until a few days later when Akpan's wife and running mate held a rally vowing to continue the campaign. As Akpan remained on the ballot, law analysts stated that legal questions would only arise if Akpan won the election; in the meantime, focus shifted to Udo-Edehe as Eno's main opponent. However, the situation swiftly returned to the previous status quo when Akpan granted bail on 28 December pending his appeal. Ironically, Eno was also on trial throughout the campaign, on charges of "cheating and dishonestly inducing delivery of property." He was convicted and declared wanted by a judge on 23 December. In early January, the arrest warrant was served to the Inspector General of Police; however, the warrant and conviction was withdrawn a few days later after a successful appeal. Later that month, nine candidates signed a peace accord in Uyo but both Akpan and Eno were not present.

On 20 January, a Federal High Court in Abuja ruled in favour of factional PDP nominee Michael Enyong and ordered INEC to declare him as the legitimate nominee; while the PDP publicly rejected the ruling, reporting revealed underlying fear that INEC may actually switch recognition to Enyong. Amid the controversy, the state chapter of the Nigeria Union of Journalists organized a debate on 29 January 2023 and invited Akpan, Essien Ekere Sunday (ADP), Robert Otu Iboro (AAC), Ezekiel Nya-Etok (ADC), and Udo-Edehe along with Udofia to participate; however, both Eno and Udofia withdrew on the day of the debate. Both the PDP and APC legal battles concluded in the following weeks, with an Appeal Court judgment siding with Eno while the Supreme Court ordered INEC to recognize Udofia in early March.

Much of the last stretch of campaigning was dominated by attention on the presidential election on 25 February. In the election, Akwa Ibom State voted for Atiku Abubakar (PDP); Abubakar won the state with 38.6% of the vote, beating Bola Tinubu (APC) at 28.9% and Peter Obi (LP) at 23.9%. The totals led to increased attention on Eno's chances in the gubernatorial race with the EiE-SBM forecast projecting Eno to win based on "the outcome of the presidential elections." At the same time, reporting from the Daily Post noted the competitiveness of the election while a Premium Times pre-election peice noted the divided opposition.

Election debates

Projections

Conduct

Electoral timetable

General election

By senatorial district 
The results of the election by senatorial district.

By federal constituency
The results of the election by federal constituency.

By local government area 
The results of the election by local government area.

See also 
 2023 Nigerian elections
 2023 Nigerian gubernatorial elections

Notes

References 

Akwa Ibom State gubernatorial election
2023
2023 Akwa Ibom State elections
Akwa Ibom